The Farm may refer to the following:

Organizations and institutions 
 Camp Peary, a Central Intelligence Agency (CIA) training facility near Williamsburg, Virginia, U.S.
 The Farm (Canada), a government residence in Canada and home to the Speaker of the Canadian House of Commons
 The Farm (San Francisco), a community center in California, U.S.
 Lewis Farm, an historic home in Charlottesville, Virginia
 Louisiana State Penitentiary, in Louisiana, U.S.
 Stanford University, in Stanford, California, U.S.

Places 
 The Farm (Tennessee), an intentional community in Tennessee, U.S.
 Area 51, a highly classified, remote detachment of Edwards Air Force Base, within the Nevada Test and Training Range

Arts, entertainment, and media

Films and television 
 The Farm (franchise), a reality competition television franchise that originated in Sweden
 The Farm (UK TV series), the UK version
 "The Farm" (Battlestar Galactica), an episode of Battlestar Galactica
 "The Farm" (Flashpoint), an episode of Flashpoint
 "The Farm" (The Office), an episode of The Office (U.S. TV series)
 The Farm, an unaired spinoff of The L Word
 The Farm: Angola, USA, a documentary set in Angola Prison

Literature 
 The Farm (Louis Bromfield novel), 1933
 The Farm (Tom Rob Smith novel), 2014
 The Farm (Joanne Ramos novel), 2019

Music

Groups and labels 
 The Farm (British band)
 The Farm (recording studio), a UK recording studio founded by the band Genesis
 The Farm (U.S. band)

Other uses in music 
 The Farm (album), the US band's only album
 "The Farm", a song by Aerosmith from Nine Lives

Other uses in arts, entertainment, and media 
 The Farm (Miró), a painting by Joan Miró shown at the National Gallery of Art in Washington, D.C.
 The Farm, a painting by Adriaen van de Velde formerly in the Hope Collection of Pictures
 "The Farm", the nickname for the Farmington Police District in The Shield

See also 
 Farm (disambiguation)